History of a Heart (Spanish:Historia de un corazón) is a 1951 Mexican drama film directed by Julio Bracho and starring Rosario Granados, Albert Carrier and Alma Delia Fuentes.

Cast

References

Bibliography 
 Jesús Ibarra. Los Bracho: tres generaciones de cine mexicano. UNAM, 2006.

External links 
 

1951 films
1951 drama films
Mexican drama films
1950s Spanish-language films
Films directed by Julio Bracho
Mexican black-and-white films
1950s Mexican films